Maksym Oleksandrovych Shumylo (born 31 August 2002) is a Ukrainian professional footballer who plays as a defender for FC Chernihiv.

Career
Shumilo is a product of Desna Chernihiv's youth system, beginning at Desna-3 Chernihiv.

FC Chernihiv 
In summer 2021, he signed with FC Chernihiv in the Ukrainian Second League. On 24 July, he made his debut with the new club against MFA Mukacheve at Avanhard Stadium in Mukacheve, replacing Maksym Serdyuk in the 46th minute.

Career statistics

Club

References

External links
 
 
 

2002 births
Living people
Footballers from Chernihiv
Ukrainian footballers
Association football defenders
FC Desna-3 Chernihiv players
FC Chernihiv players
Ukrainian Second League players
Ukrainian First League players